Tonje Kristiansen (born 29 September 1967) is a retired Norwegian sailor. She was born in Tønsberg. Along with Ida Andersen she participated in the 470 class at the 1992 Summer Olympics, where they placed 14th.

References

External links

1967 births
Living people
Sportspeople from Tønsberg
Norwegian female sailors (sport)
Olympic sailors of Norway
Sailors at the 1992 Summer Olympics – 470
Europe class world champions
World champions in sailing for Norway